Memory #1 is an album from Webb Pierce that was released in 1965 on the Decca label (DL 4604). AllMusic gave the album four-and-a-half stars. The album was Pierce's highest charting album, reaching No. 6 on the Billboard Top Country Albums chart.

Track listing
Side A
 "That's Where My Money Goes"
 "Leavin' on Your Mind	"
 "Waiting a Lifetime"
 "Invisible Tears"
 "French Riviera"
 "Love Come to Me"

Side B
 "Broken Engagement"
 "Here I Am Drunk Again"
 "With You by My Side"
 "I'm Gonna Hang One on Tonight"
 "As Long as I'll Forgive"
 "Memory #1"

References

1965 albums
Webb Pierce albums